Bruce Vawser (17 June 1929 – 1 May 2004) was an Australian cricketer. He played one first-class cricket match for Victoria in 1952.

See also
 List of Victoria first-class cricketers

References

External links
 

1929 births
2004 deaths
Australian cricketers
Victoria cricketers
Cricketers from Melbourne